

2001

See also
 2001 in Australia
 2001 in Australian television
 List of 2001 box office number-one films in Australia

2001
Australian
Films